Tiantongyuanbei Subdistrict is a subdistrict situated on the southeastern corner of Changping District, Beijing, China. It shares border with Beiqijia Town in the north and east, Laiguangying Township and Tiantongyuannan Subdistrict in the south, and Dongxiaokou Area in the west. In the year 2020, it had 142,707 people residing within its borders.

The subdistrict was created in 2012 from part of Dongxiaokou Area. It received the name Tiantongyuanbei for being the north part of Tiantongyuan, a residential community developed in 1999.

Administrative divisions 

As of 2021, Tiantongyuanbei Subdistrict consisted of 16 subdivisions, more specifically 13 communities and 3villages:

Gallery

See also 

 List of township-level divisions of Beijing

References 

Changping District
Subdistricts of Beijing